Trunk Creek is a stream in the U.S. state of South Dakota.

Trunk Creek received its name from the fact a pioneer left his trunk behind there.

See also
List of rivers of South Dakota

References

Rivers of Harding County, South Dakota
Rivers of South Dakota